The Coates Baronetcy, of Haypark in the City of Belfast, is a title in the Baronetage of the United Kingdom (see also Milnes Coates baronets, which is a separate baronetcy in England and Coats baronets, which is a separate baronetcy in Scotland). It was created on 15 July 1921 for William Coates. He was a senior partner of William F. Coates & Co, stockbrokers, of Belfast, Lord Mayor of Belfast in 1920, 1921, 1922, 1929 and 1930 and a member of the Senate of Northern Ireland. He was succeeded by his son, the second Baronet. He was a brigadier in the Royal Tank Regiment. As of 2014 the title is held by his son, the third Baronet, who succeeded in 1994.

Coates baronets, of Haypark (1921)
Sir William Frederick Coates, 1st Baronet (1866–1932)
Sir Frederick Gregory Lindsay Coates, 2nd Baronet (1916–1994)
Sir David Frederick Charlton Coates, 3rd Baronet (born 1948)

The heir apparent is the present holder's son James Gregory David Coates (born 1977).

Arms

Notes

References
Kidd, Charles, Williamson, David (editors). Debrett's Peerage and Baronetage (1990 edition). New York: St Martin's Press, 1990,

External links
Sir William Coates, 1st Baronet, at the National Portrait Gallery

Coates